Armiansk City Municipality is an administrative territorial entity of the Autonomous Republic of Crimea. Population: 

It is one of the smallest regions of the republic, located on the Isthmus of Perekop and is the main part of the peninsula that connects to mainland Ukraine.

Economy and Industry
The main employer in the city and the area is Crimean Titan (Ukrainian  ), which specializes in the refining of Titanium dioxide for use in paints, plastics, and other products.

Administrative divisions
Within the framework of administrative divisions of Russia, Armiansk is, together with a number of rural localities, incorporated separately as the town of republican significance of Armiansk—an administrative unit with the status equal to that of the districts. As a municipal division, the town of republican significance of Armiansk is incorporated as Armiansk Urban Okrug.

Within the framework of administrative divisions of Ukraine, Armiansk is incorporated as the town of republican significance of Armiansk. Ukraine does not have municipal divisions different from the administrative ones: local government in Ukraine is part of the state governmental hierarchy.

The region includes the city of Armiansk and 3 villages (Crimean Tatar names are mentioned in brackets): 
 Suvorove (Culğa)
 Voloshyne (Qulla)
 Perekop (Or Qapı)

References

 
Municipalities of Crimea